Taylor Fritz defeated Miomir Kecmanović in the final, 6–0, 5–7, 6–2 to win the singles tennis title at the 2023 Delray Beach Open.

Cameron Norrie was the reigning champion, but chose to compete in Buenos Aires instead.

Seeds
The top four seeds received a bye into the second round.

Draw

Finals

Top half

Bottom half

Qualifying

Seeds

Qualifiers

Lucky losers

Qualifying draw

First qualifier

Second qualifier

Third qualifier

Fourth qualifier

References

External links
 Main draw
 Qualifying draw

Delray Beach Open - Singles
2023 Singles
Delray Beach Open – Singles
Delray Beach Open – Singles